This more than 20-billion-year timeline of our universe shows the best estimates of major events from the universe's beginning to anticipated future events. Zero on the scale is the present day. A large step on the scale is one billion years; a small step, one hundred million years. The past is denoted by a minus sign: e.g., the oldest rock on Earth was formed about four billion years ago and this is marked at -4e+09 years, where 4e+09 represents 4 times 10 to the power of 9. The "Big Bang" event most likely happened 13.8 billion years ago; see age of the universe.

Timeline

See also

 Cosmic Calendar (age of the universe scaled to a single year)
 Formation and evolution of the Solar System
 Graphical timeline from Big Bang to Heat Death
 Graphical timeline of the Big Bang
 Graphical timeline of the Stelliferous Era
 Timeline of the early universe

Astronomy timelines
Astrophysics
Universe
Physical cosmology